Yau, also called Uruwa, is one of the Finisterre languages of Papua New Guinea.

It is spoken in Boit, Boksawin, Komdaron, Kotet, Mitmit, Mup, Sapmanga, Sapurong, Sindamon, Sugan, Towet, Worin, and Yawan villages in Morobe Province. Southern dialects are called Nungon or Nuon, and are spoken by about 1,000 people in five or six villages in the Uruwa River valley.

External links 
 Paradisec's open access collection of Selected Research Papers of Don Laycock on Languages in Papua New Guinea (DL2) includes materials on the Yau language

References

Languages of Papua New Guinea
Finisterre languages